Psalm 57 is the 57th psalm of the Book of Psalms, beginning in English in the King James Version: "Be merciful unto me, O God, be merciful unto me". In the slightly different numbering system of the Greek Septuagint version of the Bible and the Latin Vulgate, this psalm is Psalm 56. In Latin, it is known as " Miserere mei Deus". It is attributed to King David, and is described as a Michtam of David, when he fled from the face of Saul, in the cave, recalling either the cave of Adullam (1 Samuel 22), or the cave in the wilderness of En-gedi, on the western shore of the Dead Sea (1 Samuel 24).

The psalm forms a regular part of Jewish, Catholic, Lutheran, Anglican and other Protestant liturgies. It has been set to music.

Text

Hebrew Bible version 
The following is the Hebrew text of Psalm 57:

King James Version 
To the chief Musician, Altaschith, Michtam of David, when he fled from Saul in the cave.
 Be merciful unto me, O God, be merciful unto me: for my soul trusteth in thee: yea, in the shadow of thy wings will I make my refuge, until these calamities be overpast.
 I will cry unto God most high; unto God that performeth all things for me.
 He shall send from heaven, and save me from the reproach of him that would swallow me up. Selah. God shall send forth his mercy and his truth.
 My soul is among lions: and I lie even among them that are set on fire, even the sons of men, whose teeth are spears and arrows, and their tongue a sharp sword.
 Be thou exalted, O God, above the heavens; let thy glory be above all the earth.
 They have prepared a net for my steps; my soul is bowed down: they have digged a pit before me, into the midst whereof they are fallen themselves. Selah.
 My heart is fixed, O God, my heart is fixed: I will sing and give praise.
 Awake up, my glory; awake, psaltery and harp: I myself will awake early.
 I will praise thee, O Lord, among the people: I will sing unto thee among the nations.
 For thy mercy is great unto the heavens, and thy truth unto the clouds.
 Be thou exalted, O God, above the heavens: let thy glory be above all the earth.

Structure
The psalm consists of two parts. In the first, verses 1–6, David gives expression to the anxiety which he felt, imploring Divine assistance against Saul and his other enemies. In the second part, verses 7–11, he proceeds upon the confident expectation of deliverance, and stirs up his soul to the exercise of praise.

Melody
The psalm is addressed to a leader of worship; possibly this psalm was sung to a melody known as "Altaschith or "Do Not Destroy", although there is considerable uncertainty about this. A number of translations have chosen to transliterate the Hebrew expression as "al tashheth" (Tanakh) or "Al-tashheth" (Margolis). The same directive, "Do Not Destroy", can be found in the headings of Psalm 58 and Psalm 59.

Verse 6
They have prepared a net for my steps;
My soul is bowed down;
They have dug a pit before me;
Into the midst of it they themselves have fallen.

Uses

Judaism
Verse 3 is found in the repetition of the Amidah on Rosh Hashanah.

Book of Common Prayer
In the Church of England's Book of Common Prayer, this psalm is appointed to be read on the morning of the 11th day of the month, and it is a Proper Psalm for Easter Day.

Musical settings 
Heinrich Schütz set Psalm 57 in a metred version in German, "Sei mir gnädig, o Gott, mein Herr", SWV 154, as part of the Becker Psalter, first published in 1628. Johann Vierdanck set verses 8–12 in German as a sacred concerto, Mein Herz ist bereit, Gott (My heart is ready, God) for two voices, two violins and continuo, c. 1640.

References

External links 

 
 
  in Hebrew and English - Mechon-mamre
 Text of Psalm 57 according to the 1928 Psalter
 For the director. Do not destroy.* A miktam of David, when he fled from Saul into a cave. / Have mercy on me, God, have mercy on me. text and footnotes, usccb.org United States Conference of Catholic Bishops
 Psalm 57:1 introduction and text, biblestudytools.com
 Psalm 57 – From the Cave to Above the Heavens enduringword.com
 Psalm 57 Be merciful to me, O God, be merciful to me, Church of England
 Psalm 57 at biblegateway.com
 Hymns for Psalm 57 hymnary.org

057
Works attributed to David